Ausar Thompson (born January 30, 2003; pronounced ) is an American professional basketball player for the Overtime City Reapers of Overtime Elite (OTE). He and his brother Amen Thompson grew up in San Leandro, California.

High school career
Thompson attended Pine Crest School in Fort Lauderdale, Florida along with this twin brother, Amen. As a junior, he averaged 22.6 points, 7.2 rebounds, and 3.4 assists per game.

Professional career

Team Elite (2021–2022) 
In 2021, Ausar along with Amen, signed with the Overtime Elite basketball league rather than pursue a college basketball career. Ausar joined Team Elite for the 2021–22 season. With Team Elite, he won the inaugural OTE championship and was named the inaugural Finals MVP after averaging 17 points and ten rebounds per game in the best-of-three series.

City Reapers (2022–present) 
For the 2022–23 OTE season, Ausar joined the City Reapers. At the end of the regular season, he was named the league's Most Valuable Player. Ausar was also named to the All-OTE First Team. The City Reapers reached the OTE Finals, where they faced the YNG Dreamerz. With the City Reapers already having a 2–0 series lead, Ausar hit a game-winning three-pointer with three seconds remaining to help his team clinch the Finals. For his efforts, he was named Finals MVP for the second time in his career.

Ausar and his brother are both considered top prospects for the 2023 NBA draft.

References

2003 births
Living people
Small forwards
Basketball players from California
Pine Crest School alumni
People from San Leandro, California